Aberdeen School District No. 5 is a public school district in Grays Harbor County, Washington, United States, and serves the city of Aberdeen.

In May 2013, the district had an enrollment of 3,246.

Schools

High schools
Aberdeen High School (J. M. Weatherwax High School)
Harbor High School

Junior high schools
Miller Junior High School

Elementary schools
Alexander Young Elementary School
A. J. West Elementary School
Central Park Elementary School
McDermoth Elementary School
Robert Gray Elementary School
Stevens Elementary School

Special schools and programs
Hopkins Preschool

References

External links

OSPI School District Report Card 2012-13

Education in Grays Harbor County, Washington
School districts in Washington (state)
Aberdeen, Washington